Anterior ligament may refer to:

 Anterior ligament of malleus
 Anterior ligament of the head of the fibula
 Anterior ligament of the lateral malleolus
 Anterior ligament of elbow